Bence Balázs Bíró (born 14 July 1998) is a Hungarian football player who plays for Pécs on loan from MTK Budapest FC.

Career

Club career
He made his professional debut in the Segunda Liga for Vitória Guimarães B on 6 August 2016 in a game against Santa Clara.

On 30 June 2021, Bíró joined Pécs on loan.

Career statistics
.

References

External links

1998 births
Footballers from Budapest
Living people
Hungarian footballers
Hungary youth international footballers
Hungary under-21 international footballers
Association football forwards
Ferencvárosi TC footballers
MTK Budapest FC players
Budapest Honvéd FC players
Vitória S.C. B players
Pécsi MFC players
Liga Portugal 2 players
Nemzeti Bajnokság II players
Nemzeti Bajnokság I players
Hungarian expatriate footballers
Hungarian expatriate sportspeople in Portugal
Expatriate footballers in Portugal